In enzymology, an aryl-aldehyde dehydrogenase (NADP+) is an enzyme that catalyzes the chemical reaction

an aromatic aldehyde + NADP+ + AMP + diphosphate + H2O  an aromatic acid + NADPH + H+ + ATP

The 5 substrates of this enzyme are aromatic aldehyde, NADP+, AMP, diphosphate, and H2O, whereas its 4 products are aromatic acid, NADPH, H+, and ATP.

This enzyme belongs to the family of oxidoreductases, specifically those acting on the aldehyde or oxo group of donor with NAD+ or NADP+ as acceptor.  The systematic name of this enzyme class is aryl-aldehyde:NADP+ oxidoreductase (ATP-forming). Other names in common use include aromatic acid reductase, and aryl-aldehyde dehydrogenase (NADP+).

References

 
 

EC 1.2.1
NADPH-dependent enzymes
Enzymes of unknown structure